Frédéric Gioria (born 2 September 1969) is a retired French football midfielder who is the currently assistant manager of Ligue 1 club Nice.

Career
A youth product of his native club Nice since the age of 10, Gioria began his professional career with the club in 1988. He went on captain the side, and led them when they won the 1997 Coupe de France Final. He retired from professional football in 2000, after a recurring knee injury.

After retirement, he returned to Nice as a physical trainer, then managed the reserves. In 2012, he was named assistant manager by Claude Puel, and has stayed in that post since.

See also
 List of one-club men in association football

Honours

Club
OGC Nice
 Coupe de France: 1997

References

External link
FDB Profile

1969 births
Living people
Footballers from Nice
French footballers
OGC Nice players
Association football midfielders
Ligue 1 players
Ligue 2 players
Championnat National players
OGC Nice non-playing staff